Ramasundara Karunalaya Pandian is an Indian politician and former Member of the Legislative Assembly. He was elected to the Tamil Nadu legislative assembly as an Independent candidate from Sankaranayanarkoil constituency in 1952 election.

References 

Tamil Nadu politicians
Possibly living people